Oberried is a town in the district of Breisgau-Hochschwarzwald in Baden-Württemberg in southern Germany.

Oberried is home to the Barbarastollen caves, the central safekeeping archive of Germany. The Barbarastollen holds microfilms with millions of images from German archives and museums.

References 

Breisgau-Hochschwarzwald
Baden